Joshua McAdams (born March 26, 1980) is an American track and field athlete who competes in the 3,000 meter steeplechase.

Education
McAdams attended Brecksville-Broadview Heights High School, where he was a four-time OHSAA state placer in track and cross country and a three time OHSAA state placer in wrestling. He initially attended Belmont University before leaving the school to complete a two-year mission for the Church of Jesus Christ of Latter-day Saints in Thailand. On returning to school, McAdams switched to Brigham Young University where he studied microbiology and molecular biology and was a non-scholarship athlete on the track team. He won the 3000 meter Steeplechase at the 2006 NCAA National Championships.
 In 2012, McAdams graduated from the Southern College of Optometry and completed a rotation in neuro-optometry and ocular disease at the Miles Eye Center in Show Low, Arizona.

Professional career
In June 2009 McAdams won the USA Outdoor Steeplechase to become National champion for a second time. McAdams represented USA in the World championships in Berlin, Germany in August 2009.

McAdams is also a 2007 USA Outdoor champion; 2007 Pan American Games champ; and 2006 NCAA Outdoor champion. He has placed 8th at 2005 USA Outdoors and 9th at 2005 NCAA Outdoors.

After a successful 2007, McAdams finished third in the 2008 Olympic Trials for 3,000 meter steeplechase. Following the win at the 2007 AT&T USA Outdoor Championships, he won the gold medal at the 2007 Pan American Games in Rio de Janeiro, Brazil, in 8 minutes 30.49 seconds. Also that year, he improved his personal best time to  8:21.36, ending the 2007 campaign ranked #1 in the U.S. by Track & Field News.

McAdams won the 2006 NCAA Outdoor Championships 3,000m steeplechase title with his then personal best time of 8:34.10. With this victory, he was the first runner from BYU to win a distance National Champion since his coach, Ed Eyestone, who won the 5,000-meter title in 1985.

He qualified for the 2008 Summer Olympics after coming in 3rd at 2008 Olympic Trials.

Accomplishments

2009: USA Outdoor champion (8:29.91)
2008:  9th in opening round at Olympic Games (8:33.26)…3rd at Olympic Trials (8:21.99)...ranked #3 in U.S. by T&FN...best of 8:21.99.
2007: USA Outdoor champion (8:24.46)…Pan American Games champ (8:30.49)… 5th in heats at World Outdoors (8:32.46)...2nd at Nike Prefontaine Classic (8:21.36PR)…2nd at Payton Jordan Cardinal Invitational (8:23.69)…ranked #1 in U.S. by T&FN…best of 8:21.36.
2006: NCAA champion (8:34.10)…10th at USA Outdoors (8:37.91)…best of 8:34.10.
2005: 8th at USA Outdoors (8:39.81)…9th at NCAA Outdoors (8:36.88)…best of 8:34.84.
2004: Best of 8:45.26.

Personal life
McAdams is a member of the Church of Jesus Christ of Latter-day Saints.  He served a two-year church mission in Bangkok, Thailand. He currently lives in Meridian, Idaho, with his wife, Whitney, and four kids. He owns and operates McAdams Eye Care PLLC.

References

External links
 
 
 byucougars.com
 YahooOlympics

1980 births
Living people
Latter Day Saints from Ohio
Belmont University alumni
American Mormon missionaries in Thailand
BYU Cougars men's track and field athletes
American male steeplechase runners
Athletes (track and field) at the 2007 Pan American Games
Athletes (track and field) at the 2008 Summer Olympics
Olympic track and field athletes of the United States
American expatriate sportspeople in Thailand
Pan American Games gold medalists for the United States
Pan American Games medalists in athletics (track and field)
BYU Cougars men's cross country runners
Medalists at the 2007 Pan American Games